The Paper Currency Act, 1861 is an act in India dating from the British colonial rule, that is currently no longer in force.

Background 

Before the passing of the Act, there were a number of commercial banks in India which issued their own banknotes to the general public. Some of these commercial banks included:
 The General Bank of Bengal and Bihar
 The Bank of Hindostan, which had been set up by the Alexander and Co. agency house

The East India Company, which then ruled over large parts of India, wanted to take away this power of issuing banknotes from the commercial banks, as a result of which The Paper Currency Act, 1861 was enacted into law.

Tenets and Precepts 

After the enactment of the Act, the East India Company government became the sole issuer of banknotes in India.

The three Presidency Banks of India became the issuer of banknotes on the behalf of the East India Company:
 Bank of Calcutta
 Bank of Bombay
 Bank of Madras

Repealment 

Just a few years before the Independence of India, the Reserve Bank of India Act, 1934 was passed which effectively repealed The Paper Currency Act, 1861. From now onwards, the Reserve Bank of India became the sole issuer of banknotes in India.

References

External links 
The Text of the Act
Interpretation of the Act by Reserve Bank of India
History of the Act
Further Amendments to the Act

Law of India
1861 in law
Negotiable instrument law
Legislation in British India
1861 in British law
1861 in India